is a former Japanese football player.

Club statistics

References

External links

1984 births
Living people
Miyazaki Sangyo-keiei University alumni
Association football people from Okinawa Prefecture
Japanese footballers
J2 League players
Japan Football League players
Sagan Tosu players
Gainare Tottori players
Association football defenders